Filippo Tripi (born 6 January 2002) is an Italian professional footballer who plays as a midfielder for Slovenian PrvaLiga club Mura.

Career
Tripi is a youth product of Roma, where he served as a captain of their youth team. He made his professional debut with Roma in a 2–0 UEFA Europa League win over CFR Cluj on 26 November 2020.

On 16 December 2022, Tripi signed a contract until 2025 with Slovenian PrvaLiga outfit Mura.

References

External links

Lega Serie A Profile
FIGC U18 Profile

2002 births
Living people
Footballers from Rome
Italian footballers
Italy youth international footballers
Association football defenders
Association football midfielders
A.S. Roma players
NŠ Mura players
Slovenian PrvaLiga players
Italian expatriate footballers
Italian expatriate sportspeople in Slovenia
Expatriate footballers in Slovenia